The 1976 E3 Harelbeke was the 19th edition of the E3 Harelbeke cycle race and was held on 20 March 1976. The race started and finished in Harelbeke. The race was won by Walter Planckaert.

General classification

References

1976 in Belgian sport
1976
1976 in road cycling